An accident is an unexpected and unintended event.

Accident or accidents may also refer to:

Principal word senses
 Accident, an unintended, normally unwanted event not directly caused by humans
 Unintended consequences, also sometimes called accidents, outcomes not foreseen and intended by purposeful action
 Accident (philosophy), the counterpart of essence; traits existing nonessentially
 Accident (fallacy)
 Accident (geology)

People
 Accident, a person born from an unintended pregnancy (the term is used in both derogatory and nonderogatory ways)

Places
 Accident, Maryland, a town in the United States of America

Arts, entertainment, and media

Film
 Accident (1928 film) (Polizeibericht Überfall), a German film directed by Ernö Metzner
 Accident (1967 film), a British film directed by Joseph Losey, with a screenplay by Harold Pinter based on the novel by Nicholas Mosley
 Accident (1976 film), a Romanian film directed by Sergiu Nicolaescu
 Accident (1985 film), a Kannada film directed by Shankar Nag
 Accident (2008 film), an Indian film directed by Ramesh Aravind
 Accident (2009 film), a Hong Kong film directed by Soi Cheang
 Accident (2012 film), a Bengali film directed by Nandita Roy & Shiboprosad Mukherjee
 Accident (2013 film), a Nigerian film directed by Teco Benson
 Accident, a 2017 South African film starring Roxane Hayward

Literature
 Accident (Mosley novel), a 1965 novel by writer Nicholas Mosley, later adapted into the film, Accident (1967)
 Accident (novel), a 1994 novel by Danielle Steel

Music
 Accident, a 1982 album by British bass guitarist and composer John Greaves
 "Accident", a song by Saint Etienne from Reserection EP, later remixed as "He's on the Phone"
 "Accidents", a song by Thunderclap Newman from Hollywood Dream
 "Accidents", a song by Alexisonfire from Watch Out!

Television
 "Accident" (Bottom episode), an episode of 1990s British sitcom Bottom
 "Accident", an episode of the British sitcom Only When I Laugh

See also 
 The Accident (disambiguation)

no:Ulykke